St. Ann's Academy was built by the Roman Catholic Congregation of Women the Sisters of Saint Anne of Lachine, Quebec. The chapel, designed by Father Joseph Michaud, was built in 1858 as St. Andrew's Cathedral was moved in 1886 to be St. Ann's Chapel and is the oldest part of the Academy. Later a convent was added (1887) to the west side of the Academy and behind the Academy (1910). St. Ann’s Academy was a girls Catholic boarding and day school from grade 3-12, and boys K - 3, as well as serving as the Provincial House, convent and novitiate. The academy also served as a residential school for First Nations orphans and girls.

The Sisters of St. Ann closed the Academy and in 1973 sold the property to the provincial government of British Columbia  which used it as office space for the public service for a few years, but it was in need of major repairs and had to be closed. Years-long civic debate of diverse proposals for the future of the building and site ensued.

Placed under the stewardship of the Provincial Capital Commission, the interior of the building was gutted and rebuilt, basement to attic, providing seismic upgrade and rehabilitation into modern office space. Once completed, the majority of the building was leased to the BC Ministry of Advanced Education, a use consistent with the Sisters' aims. The exterior facade of his heritage building was retained and repaired. The chapel, parlours and infirmary were retained as an interpretive centre and restored to their 1920s decor. The auditorium at the other end of the building was also seismically upgraded and restored and is used for public lectures and concerts. The building was re-opened in 1997.

The chapel was deconsecrated when the Sisters sold the property. Since the restoration of the chapel and the adjacent Novitiate Garden, these have been used as a venue for weddings and other functions.

An annex behind the main building which had been occupied by the Victoria Conservatory of Music was demolished on September 11, 2001 following the Conservatory's move to the former Metropolitan United Church buildings. The site was cleared and became green space, merging the Academy grounds with the adjacent Beacon Hill Park.

Plaques & Signage
Andrew Petter, Minister Responsible for the Provincial Capital Commission, proposal to restore St. Ann's, at a cost of $16 million.

Architecture
St. Ann’s Academy is an excellent example of Victoria's Quebec Colonial style architecture.

The Chapel
St. Ann's Chapel was the original St. Andrew's Cathedral of the city of Victoria. The chapel of St. Andrew’s was designed by Brother (later Father) Michaud of the Clerics of Saint Viator.

Other art works
The Sisters of Saint Ann had two cemeteries at the Academy, where many of the first sisters were buried. In 1908, a plot in the northeast corner of Ross Bay Cemetery was opened for future burials. Upon the closure of the Academy in 1974, the first Sisters were exhumed and reinterred in the Sisters' plot in Ross Bay.

Many of the stained glass windows were vandalized during its time of abandonment, and had to be rebuilt during the reconstruction.

Sister Mary Osithe was the painter of 'The Immaculate Conception' painting that sits in the Sisters waiting room. Sister Mary Osithe was also the architect of Little Flower Academy school in Vancouver and St. Ann's Boys' School, Quamichan.

See also
List of oldest buildings in Canada
List of historic places in Victoria, British Columbia
Roman Catholic Diocese of Victoria in Canada
Little Flower Academy
Sisters of Saint Ann

References

External links

St. Ann's Academy - official website
Sisters of St. Ann - BC mission - founding order 2011 archive
Catholic Diocese of Victoria
Historic Sites & Monuments Board of Canada - Reason for designation

National Historic Sites in British Columbia
Catholic secondary schools in British Columbia
Schools in Victoria, British Columbia
Tourist attractions in Victoria, British Columbia
Educational institutions established in 1871
1871 establishments in British Columbia